Torquay Boys' Grammar School is a selective boys grammar school in Torquay, Devon, England. , it had 1,113 students. The school was founded in 1904.

It is situated in Shiphay, south of Torbay Hospital, not far from the A3022 and Torre railway station as well as being directly next to Torquay Girls Grammar School.

History
The school was founded in 1904 as "The Torquay Pupil Teachers Centre", with premises in Abbey Hall, Rock Road. It opened its doors on 4 September 1904. The school, by now called "Torquay School", later moved to its new location in Barton Road, where it was established under its current name. The new School was later rebuilt on land purchased from Torquay Grammar School for Girls in 1982.

As part of its centenary in 2004, the school opened a new hall known as the Cavanna Centenary Hall.

The school currently occupies Shiphay Manor, a 17th-century manor with extensive parkland, known as 'The Paddock' (owned by the neighbouring Girls' School), used by boys in year 11 or above for recreation. The school is made up of a number of buildings: The Centenary Hall (used for charities and assemblies), Music Block (also houses the PE changing rooms), TBGS Languages Centre (where languages are taught; it is also home to a kitchen for teacher use), the D Block (used for Philosophy & Applied Ethics and Business and Enterprise), the Manor (used for Art and Media Studies), the Observatory (used by the astronomical society) and the main school building (used for all subjects otherwise.)

In September 2010, it gained Academy status.

A long-standing headteacher, Roy Pike, worked for 43 years at the school, 27 years as head. He retired in 2013, and was succeeded by Peter Lawrence.

Buildings and Facilities

 Main School Building – Houses the Bistro (now known as the "Retreat"), Offices, Reception, Library, Sixth Form Block, Sports Hall, Science, Maths, English, Geography, History, ICT and Technology Classrooms.
 Manor – Art and Media Studies are taught there. 
 Languages College – The school's languages are taught there (Spanish, French, German, Japanese and Mandarin) and it also houses a kitchen that teachers can use.
 Centenary Hall – Used for assemblies and some clubs. Can be hired out to the community.
 Music Suite and PE Changing Rooms- Music is taught upstairs and the PE Changing Rooms are downstairs, although the Sports Hall is situated inside the main school building.
 D Block – Philosophy & Applied Ethics and Business and Enterprise are taught here.
 Astroturf – A bottom astroturf used mainly for football and can be hired out to the community. The top astroturf is mainly used for football, tennis and basketball. Can also be hired out to the community.
 Playing fields – These are used for all sports and can not be hired out to the community.

Former teachers
 Arnold Ridley – between the wars- playwright and actor who played Private Godfrey in Dad's Army
 John Granger, Headmaster from 1996 to 2009 of Bournemouth School (former Deputy Head of school)
 Robert Masters, Headmaster since 2004 of The Judd School (former Deputy Head)
 Barry Sindall, Headmaster from 1990 to 2008 of Colyton Grammar School, and Chief Executive since 2008 of the Grammar Schools Headteachers Association (former Deputy Head)
 Steve Margetts, Principal since 2014 of Torquay Academy (former Head of Davys House and Business, Economics and Enterprise)

Headteachers
 William Jackson 1904-1936
 John W. Harmer 1936 -1966
 Gerald Smith 1966-1981
 Barry K. Hobbs 1981-1986
 Roy E Pike 1987-2013
 Peter Lawrence 2014-

Partnerships
The school is partnered with the neighboring Girls Grammar School (Torquay Girls' Grammar School) and Torquay Academy.

Observatory

The school has its own astronomical observatory. Opened in 1989, it houses a 19.2" (0.5m) Newtonian reflector, and is used by the school itself, by the Torbay Astronomical Society, and is also regularly open to the public.

The astronomer and broadcaster Sir Patrick Moore was a patron of the school and maintained close ties – Ralegh House even performed the premiere of his operetta "Galileo" in the late 1990s. Current presenter of the BBC television programme "The Sky at Night" Chris Lintott, who lectures at Oxford University, was also a student of the school.

Academic
The school consistently is among the best public examination results in Devon and has become a candidate school which, as of academic year 2009–2011, will offer the International Baccalaureate as a sixth form examination option in addition to A levels.

The school has also performed well at national academic competitions; winning the UK Mathematics Trust and the Further Maths Network "Math Challenge", finishing as runners up in the national quiz championship for schools and finishing third in the Ogden Trust National Schools Business Competition, to name but a few.

House system
Upon joining the school, every student is assigned to one of the school's six houses. The houses, consisting of around 25 pupils from a year group making a form group, compete in both academic and sporting disciplines to gain points in that year's House Championship. The Houses, of which six are currently in existence, are named after a famous Devon landmark as of 2021.

Burgh house

Burgh House is named after Burgh Island; its house colour is blue.

Dart house
Dart House is named after the River Dart; its colour is white. Formerly called Clifford House (circa 1950s) and then Davys House.

Fox Tor house
Fox Tor House is named after Fox Tor in Dartmoor. It is the second-youngest of the current houses (splitting from the Rougemont House (formerly Ralegh) in 1994) and its house colour is yellow.

Goodrington house
Goodrington house is named after Goodrington near Paignton, Devon. The house colour is green.

Haldon house

Haldon house is named after Haldon Forest. Haldon house is the newest house, established in the academic year 2006–2007.

Rougemont house
Rougemont house is named after Rougemont Castle. Rougemont is one of the original four houses and its house colour is red. This house was formerly known as Ralegh house.

Centenary 
To celebrate the school's centenary in 2004, the school decided to create a new theatre and hall, which was completed in 2007 and staged its first production, Joseph and the Amazing Technicolor Dreamcoat, in early May of that year. The hall was officially opened in March 2008 by The Earl of Wessex, and named the 'Cavanna Centenary Hall' in recognition of donations from local business the Cavanna Group.

Notable members of staff
 Retired teacher Carole Church was awarded the Ted Wragg Teaching Award for Lifetime Achievement in 2004.
 This was followed by retired teacher Dave Berry who was also awarded the Ted Wragg Teaching Award for Lifetime Achievement in 2006.

Notable former pupils

 Martin Turner, rock musician, Wishbone Ash
 Raymond Cattell, psychologist Pioneer of psychometric testing
 Neil Collings 
 Ben Howard, Musician
 Chris Read, cricketer who played as wicket-keeper for the England cricket team
 Hiley Edwards (1951–2009), cricketer who played for and captained Devon County Cricket Club
 Richard Leaman , CEO of The Guide Dogs for the Blind Association and former senior Royal Navy officer
 Ted Luscombe, Bishop of Brechin 1975–90, Primus of the Scottish Episcopal Church 1985-1990
 Terence Frederick Mitchell (1919-2007), Professor of Linguistics and Phonetics, University of Leeds.
 Harry Robinson, World War II veteran and Distinguished Service Order (DSO) recipient
 Adrian Sanders, Liberal Democrat MP for Torbay, between 1997 and 2015.
 Professor David Southwood, Science Director of the European Space Agency, President of the Royal Astronomical Society, Head of Physics Department Imperial College.
 Bill Strang , Chief Engineer from 1960 to 1967, and Technical Director from 1967 to 1971 at the British Aircraft Corporation (BAC), and hence headed the design team of Concorde (with Lucien Servanty) as its UK Technical Director from 1966 to 1977
Roger Deakins, Academy Award-winning Cinematographer.
Doc Rowe, folklorist, author and film-maker, prominent lecturer on and advocate for folk traditions and folk music.
Yorick Wilks Pioneer Professor of Artificial Intelligence applied to language processing on a computer.
Chris Lintott Professor of Astrophysics in the Department of Physics at Oxford University and The Sky at Night presenter.
Alex Fletcher, professional footballer for Bath City.
Sam Skinner (rugby union), professional rugby union player for Edinburgh Rugby and Scotland national rugby union team.
Matt Hickey, first-class cricketer

References

External links
 
 School profile from Direct gov

Grammar schools in Torbay
Educational institutions established in 1904
Boys' schools in Devon
Academies in Torbay
International Baccalaureate schools in England
1904 establishments in England
Schools in Torquay